The Syungyude (Süŋgüde) is a river in the Sakha Republic (Yakutia), Russia. It is the largest tributary of the Molodo, of the Lena basin.

The Syungyude  flows across the Zhigansky and Bulunsky district. The banks of the river are uninhabited.

Geography
The Syungyude originates in the eastern Central Siberian Plateau. In its upper course it flows southeast for a long distance, finally descending into a floodplain. It meanders strongly just north of the Motorchuna, flowing parallel to it until it turns northeast and then NNE in a wide arc. In its last stretch the Syungyude flows roughly northwards with the floodplain of the Lena to the east.

Tributaries 

See also
List of rivers of Russia

References

External links
Сусов Михаил Васильевич. Геология в письмах. Москва, издательство Рунета, 2010 г. - Река Сюнгююдэ (Study of Upper Jurassic diamond-bearing conglomerates in the Sungyuyude River valley)

Rivers of the Sakha Republic